"Pop/Stars" (stylized in all caps) is a song by virtual K-pop girl group K/DA. It was released as a single on November 2, 2018, as promotion for the 2018 League of Legends World Championship. The single became popular with one of the fastest viewership records for its music video on YouTube. Soyeon and Miyeon from (G)I-dle, Madison Beer and Jaira Burns provided vocals for the song and represented the group as its human counterpart in the live performance at the finals of the tournament.

Commercially, the song topped the World Digital Songs chart, making K/DA the fourth K-pop girl group to top the chart and fifth female act overall. The song has been certified platinum by the Recording Industry Association of America (RIAA), making K/DA and (G)I-dle the first K-pop girl groups in history to achieve this milestone.

Background and composition
K/DA consists of four virtual characters, whose vocals were provided by Soyeon and Miyeon from (G)I-dle, Madison Beer and Jaira Burns. "Pop/Stars" has a length of three minutes and eleven seconds and a tempo of 170 beats per minute. It is a bilingual song, featuring vocals in English by Beer and Burns, and in both English and Korean by Soyeon and Miyeon. The song was composed by Sébastien Najand.

The song was featured in the Ubisoft game Just Dance 2022. It is also included in an included song pack in the virtual reality game Beat Saber.

Critical reception
Julia Alexander of The Verge called the song "a straight up banger."

Music video
The music video for "Pop/Stars" was released alongside the single and was produced by French studio Fortiche Production. It stars characters from the game, and was used to promote new skins for the game. A dance video was also released. The official music video for "Pop/Stars" reached 30 million views on YouTube in five days, and 100 million in one month. On April 2, 2019, the music video reached 200 million views. As of March 9, 2023, the music video has 545 million views.

Live performances
Soyeon, Miyeon, Madison Beer, and Jaira Burns performed the single at the 2018 League of Legends World Championship opening ceremony. The singers performed alongside augmented reality versions of the characters that they portrayed. During an online concert by (G)I-dle, the six members performed a cover of "Pop/Stars".

During their Just MeI-dle World Tour, the remaining five members added the song to their regular setlist as well.

Credits and personnel

 Vocals – Soyeon and Miyeon of (G)I-dle, Madison Beer and Jaira Burns
 Riot Music Team – production, composer, songwriting, vocal production, mix engineer, mastering engineer
 Sebastien Najand – composer, songwriting
 Justin Tranter - executive producer
 Harloe - songwriting, additional vocals
 Lydia Paek - Korean translation
 Minji Kim - Korean translation

Charts

Certifications

Release history

References

2018 singles
2018 songs
(G)I-dle songs
Madison Beer songs
K-pop songs
Macaronic songs
League of Legends World Championship